Roosterville is an unincorporated settlement located to the north of the city of Liberty in Clay County, Missouri. Roosterville has an airport.

References

Unincorporated communities in Clay County, Missouri
Unincorporated communities in Missouri